Pachythrix hampsoni is a moth of the family Noctuidae. It is found from north-eastern Queensland to central New South Wales.

The wingspan is about 30 mm.

External links
Australian Faunal Directory
Australian Insects

Hadeninae
Moths of Australia
Moths described in 1975